Wang Jie (born 4 April 1982) is a Chinese footballer who currently plays for China League One side Nanjing City.

Career statistics

Club

Notes

References

1982 births
Living people
Chinese footballers
Association football defenders
China League One players
Chinese Super League players
Jiangsu F.C. players